Pellenz is a Verbandsgemeinde ("collective municipality") in the district Mayen-Koblenz, in Rhineland-Palatinate, Germany. It is situated north-east of Mayen, and south of Andernach. The seat of the municipality was in Andernach, which was not part of the municipality itself and is now in Plaidt since 2017.

The Verbandsgemeinde Pellenz consists of the following Ortsgemeinden ("local municipalities"):

 Kretz 
 Kruft 
 Nickenich 
 Plaidt 
 Saffig

External links
pellenz.de

Pellenz